Tawatha Agee (born November 14, 1954) is an American backing vocalist and songwriter. Her voice has been described in The New York Times as an "acrobatic, gospel-charged soprano." She was the lead singer of funk and soul band Mtume; her soulful lead vocals are featured on their 1983 R&B hit "Juicy Fruit".

Agee has worked consistently as a backing vocalist from the mid-1970s to the present day, predominantly with James Mtume, who produced her one solo studio album, Welcome to My Dream, for Epic Records in 1987. She is also a part of "the Lovely Ladies" trio, who tour with the Dave Matthews Band.

Early life and education
Born in Pittsburgh, Pennsylvania and raised in Newark, New Jersey, Agee attended Newark Arts High School and Howard University.

Career

Mtume and backup singing
Agee sang on James Mtume's second studio album, Rebirth Cycle (1977), and on the Mtume album, Kiss This World Goodbye (1978), which features "The Closer I Get to You" (originally sung by Roberta Flack and Donny Hathaway on Flack's 1977 album, Blue Lights in the Basement), and continued with the band on their 1980 follow-up, In Search of the Rainbow Seekers ("Mrs. Sippi," "Give It On Up (If You Want To)"). She also provided backing vocals on three studio albums by Stephanie Mills, What Cha' Gonna Do with My Lovin' (1979), Sweet Sensation (1980), and Stephanie (1981), plus Keep It Comin (1981) by Jean Knight and Premium. Agee cowrote the Stephanie Mills-Teddy Pendergrass duet "Two Hearts" with Mtume bandmates James Mtume and Reggie Lucas and, with Howard King, co-wrote "Getting Ready for Love" for her friend Ullanda McCullough (from her 1982 studio album, Watching You Watching Me). With King she also co-wrote, and sang on, "Keep Goin' On", produced by Mtume and Lucas, for saxophonist Gary Bartz.

Agee was the featured vocalist on many of Mtume's hits, including the oft-sampled "Juicy Fruit" (UK Top 40, 1983, and the number-one R&B spot, in the U.S., for eight weeks in the summer of 1983). She remained with the band through their last two studio albums, You, Me and He (1984) and Theater of the Mind (1986), contributing guitar and keyboard parts, respectively, in addition to vocals.

Solo recording
Tawatha Agee's only solo studio album to date, Welcome to My Dream, was issued by Epic Records in 1987 and produced by James Mtume along with James Batton and Mtume bandmate Ed Moore. Agee, Mtume, Moore, and Mtume keyboardist Philip Field wrote songs for the album.

Return to backup singing
After Welcome to My Dream (1987), Agee focused again on session singing. She has recorded with artists such as Blancmange, Bruce Fisher (Red Hot, 1977), Cabo Frio, Chromeo, the Heath Brothers, David Sanborn, B. B. & Q., LeVert, Kashif, Keni Burke, Luther Vandross, Aretha Franklin, Al Jarreau, Roxy Music, Rena Scott, Jewel, David Bowie, Steely Dan, Blue Man Group, the B-52s, Celine Dion, R. Kelly, Sting, the O'Jays, Laurie Anderson, Foreigner and Scritti Politti. She was also featured on the Hercules (1997) soundtrack as a singing voice of one of the muses.

Solo discography

Albums
Welcome to My Dream (Epic Records, 1987)

Singles
 "Are You Serious?" (Epic, 1987)
 "Thigh Ride" (Epic, 1987)
 "Did I Dream You" (Epic, 1987)
 "Love On Hold" (Glitterbox/Defected Records, 2017) with Aeroplane

References

External links
 
 
 
 Interview on SoulMusic.com

1954 births
American soul singers
African-American women singers
Howard University alumni
Musicians from Newark, New Jersey
Musicians from Pittsburgh
Newark Arts High School alumni
Singers from New Jersey
Singers from Pennsylvania
Living people
American sopranos
21st-century American women singers
21st-century American singers
20th-century American singers
20th-century American women singers